Batman & Robin: Music from and Inspired by the "Batman & Robin" Motion Picture is the soundtrack album to the motion picture Batman & Robin (1997).

Background
Despite the overwhelming negative reception of the film itself, the soundtrack album for Batman & Robin was well-received, and became a sales success, being certified platinum by the RIAA. The soundtrack included songs by R. Kelly, Arkarna, Jewel, Goo Goo Dolls, R.E.M., Bone Thugs-n-Harmony, and The Smashing Pumpkins. The Smashing Pumpkins song "The End Is the Beginning Is the End", which played over the film’s closing credits, won the 1998 Grammy Award for Best Hard Rock Performance. Three songs from the soundtrack became top-ten hits in the United States: Jewel's contribution, a radio-mix version of "Foolish Games" (US number two), Bone Thugs-n-Harmony's "Look into My Eyes" (US number four), and R. Kelly's "Gotham City" (US number nine).  In addition, the track "Fun for Me" by relative newcomers Moloko reached number four on the US Dance Play Chart, and introduced the Irish-English act to a new American audience.

Track listing
"The End Is the Beginning Is the End" by The Smashing Pumpkins – 5:10
"Look into My Eyes" by Bone Thugs-n-Harmony – 4:28
"Gotham City" by R. Kelly – 4:56
"House on Fire" by Arkarna – 3:24
"Revolution" by R.E.M. – 3:04
"Foolish Games" by Jewel – 4:00
"Lazy Eye" by Goo Goo Dolls – 3:46
"Breed" by Lauren Christy – 3:05
"The Bug" by Soul Coughing – 3:09
"Fun for Me" by Moloko – 5:08
"Poison Ivy" by Me'Shell NdegéOcello – 3:33
"True to Myself" by Eric Benét – 4:41
"A Batman Overture" by Elliot Goldenthal – 3:35
"Moaner" by Underworld – 10:17
"The Beginning Is the End Is the Beginning" by The Smashing Pumpkins – 4:58

Personnel
Executive album producers: Danny Bramson and Gary LeMel
Executive in charge of music for Warner Bros. Pictures: Gary LeMel
Music supervisor: Danny Bramson
Album business affairs: Keith Zajic, Lisa B. Margolis and David Altschul 
Design: Lawrence Azerrad
Soundtrack coordination: Jason Cienkus
Mastering: Keith Blake at W.B.I.H.S.

Charts

Album

Singles

A: "The End Is the Beginning Is the End" did not chart on the Billboard Hot 100, but did peak on the Billboard Hot 100 Airplay chart at number 50.
B: "Look into My Eyes" also peaked on the Billboard Hot R&B/Hip-Hop Songs chart at number 4.
C: "Gotham City" also peaked on the Billboard Hot R&B/Hip-Hop Songs chart at number 9.
D: "Fun for Me" did not chart on the Billboard Hot 100, but did peak on the Billboard Hot Dance Club Play chart at number 4.

Certifications

References

1997 soundtrack albums
Batman (1989 film series)
Batman film soundtracks
1990s film soundtrack albums
Warner Records soundtracks
Robin (character) in other media